Stereomerus diadelus is a species of beetle in the family Cerambycidae. It was described by Martins and Galileo in 1994. It is known from Venezuela.

References

Desmiphorini
Beetles described in 1994